Selahattin Demirtaş was officially announced as the candidate of the People's Democratic Party (HDP) on 4 May 2018, after members of the party had hinted at his candidacy weeks in advance. Party leader Pervin Buldan declared that Demirtaş, a jailed former co-chair of the HDP, would be leading a five-party "Kurdish alliance" into the general election.

Program 

Defending “No” for the 2017 Turkish constitutional referendum
18 proposed amendments to the Constitution of Turkey(Full details)
 More Minority and Women’s rights
 Building a country without Capitalism
 The support of Turkish membership of the European Union

Foreign policy 

On European Union–Turkey relations, Demirtaş is known for his long-time support for Turkey’s EU accession process, focusing on the pledge to uphold human rights, local democracy, separation of powers and the rule of law as the main tenets of his future presidency. He distinguishes himself from other candidates in his unwavering criticism of what he sees as Brussels's neo-liberal economic agenda.

Election Result

Party Representation

Notes

References 

2018 Turkish general election
Demirtaş